Craft is a surname. Notable people with the surname include:

Aaron Craft (born 1991), American basketball player
Charles Craft (1902–1968), English-born American film and television editor
Chris Craft (racing driver) (1939–2021), British motor racing driver
Christine Craft (born 1944), American radio talk show host and former television anchorperson
Donnie Craft (born 1959), American football player
Edward B. Craft (1881–1929), American electrical and communications engineer
Ellen Craft (c. 1826–c. 1891), slave from Macon, Georgia, whose escape was widely publicized
James Craft (disambiguation), several people
Jason Craft (born 1976), American professional football cornerback
 Joe Craft (born 1950), American businessman and philanthropist
Juanita Craft (1902–1985), American civil rights pioneer
 Kelly Craft (born 1962), United States Ambassador to the United Nations and United States Ambassador to Canada
Kinuko Y. Craft (born 1940), American artist
Marcella Craft (1874–1959), American soprano
Melanie Craft (born 1969), American romance novelist
Nikki Craft (born 1949), American political activist
Paul Craft (1938–2014), American singer-songwriter
Robert Craft (1923–2015), American conductor and writer on music
Russ Craft (1919–2009), American professional football defensive back
Shanice Craft (born 1993), German athlete
Shelley Craft (born 1976), Australian television personality
Shirley Craft (1927–2010), American politician and educator
Tom Craft (born 1953), American football coach

See also
Crafts (surname)